Camarate: accidente ou atentado? (English: Camarate: accident or assassination?) is a 2001 Portuguese film directed by Luis Filipe Rocha on the investigation of the 1980 Camarate air crash. It was Portugal's submission to the 74th Academy Awards for the Academy Award for Best Foreign Language Film, but it was not accepted as a nominee.

See also

List of submissions to the 74th Academy Awards for Best Foreign Language Film

References

External links

2001 films
2000s Portuguese-language films
2001 drama films
Films directed by Luís Filipe Rocha
Portuguese drama films